The 1997 Men's Intercontinental Cup was a qualifier for the 1998 Men's Hockey World Cup. It was held in Kuala Lumpur, Malaysia, from Tuesday March 4 to Saturday March 15, 1997. Twelve nations took part, and they were divided into two groups of six in the preliminary round. The top six teams joined the other six that have already qualified: Australia, England, Germany, India, Netherlands, and Pakistan.

Squads

( 1.) Pablo Moreira (gk)
( 2.) Jorge Querejeta
( 3.) Edgardo Pailos
( 4.) Maximiliano Caldas
( 5.) Diego Chiodo
( 6.) Fernando Moresi
( 7.) Rodolfo Pérez
( 8.) Carlos Retegui
( 9.) Carlos Geneyro
(10.) Santiago Capurro
(11.) Jorge Lombi
(12.) Germán Orozco
(13.) Rodolfo Schmitt (gk)
(14.) Martin Costanzo
(15.) Andrés Castelli
(16.) Eduardo Peralta
Head coach
Alejandro Verga

( 1.) Edouard Gordich
( 2.) Dmitry Youkovskyi
( 3.) Sergey Drozdov
( 4.) Leonid Onyouk
( 5.) Igor Voytiouk
( 6.) Alexandre Mankovskyi
( 7.) Alexandre Boudnikov
( 8.) Andrey Tcheboharev
( 9.) Vladimir Kachkar
(10.) Nikolay Sankovets
(11.) Stepan Klimovitch
(12.) Yuriy Korotchenho
(13.) Albert Vintskevich
(14.) Igor Pakhalchuk
(15.) Igor Tsarev
(16.) Valentinas Vachkis
Head coach
unknown

( 1.) Vincent Deneumostier (gk)
( 2.) Hugues Ciselet
( 3.) John Toussaint
( 4.) Thierry Renaer
( 5.) Maximilien Willems
( 6.) Sebastien Mommens
( 7.) Joeri Beunen
( 8.) Philippe van Hemelen
( 9.) Alexandre de Chaffoy
(10.) Michel Kinnen
(11.) Gérald Dewamme
(12.) Patrick Pille
(13.) Mick Beunen
(14.) Jean Willems
(15.) Marc Coudron
(16.) Yves Henet (gk)
Head coach
unknown

( 1.) Hari Kant (gk)
( 2.) Mike Mahood (gk)
( 3.) Ian Bird
( 4.) Alan Brahmst
( 5.) Robin d'Abreo
( 6.) Chris Gifford
( 7.) Patrick Burrows
( 8.) Andrew Griffiths
( 9.) Ken Pereira
(10.) Bubli Chohan
(11.) Peter Milkovich
(12.) Bindi Kullar
(13.) Rob Short
(14.) Rob Edamura
(15.) Marek Gacek
(16.) Rick Roberts
Head coach
Shiaz Virjee

( 1.) Ivan Bateman (gk)
( 2.) Nigel Henderson
( 3.) Neil Cooke
( 4.) Alan Dowd
( 5.) Alastair Dunne
( 6.) Colin Hade
( 7.) Chris Jackson
( 8.) Erroll Lutton
( 9.) David McAnulty
(10.) Mark Irwin
(11.) Gregg Ian Sterritt
(12.) Julian Stevenson
(13.) Robert Taylor
(14.) Lee Tumilty
(15.) Mark Tumilty
(16.) Daniel Clarke
Head coach
unknown

( 1.) Paul Lopez
( 2.) Singh Maninderijt
( 3.) Lailin Abu Hassan
( 4.) Singh Kerpal
( 5.) Kuhan Shanmuganathan
( 6.) Nor Azian Haji Bakar
( 7.) Chairil Anwar Abdul Aziz
( 8.) Lam Mun Fatt
( 9.) Shanker Ramu
(10.) Nor Saiful Nasiruddin
(11.) Kaliswaran Muniandy
(12.) Singh Aphthar
(13.) Mirnawan Nawawi
(14.) Mohammed Nizam Nordin
(15.) Arul Selvaraj Anthonisamy
(16.) Ahmad Suffian
Head coach
Volker Knapp

( 1.) Paul Derham
( 2.) Dion Gosling
( 3.) Greg Russ
( 4.) Umesh Parag
( 5.) Darren Smith
( 6.) Andrew Timlin
( 7.) Brett Leaver
( 8.) Andrew Buckley
( 9.) Ken Robinson
(10.) Jamie Smith
(11.) Simon Towns
(12.) John Radovonich
(13.) Richard Tattershaw
(14.) Andrew van der Bent
(15.) Scott Anderson (gk)
(16.) Grant Croft (gk)
Head coach
Jim Cahill

( 1.) Paweł Sobczak (gk)
( 2.) Slawomir Lukaszewski
( 3.) Paweł Jakubiak
( 4.) Dariusz Małecki
( 5.) Maciej Matuszynski
( 6.) Tomasz Szmidt
( 7.) Robert Grzeszczak
( 8.) Zbigniew Juszczak
( 9.) Marcin Nyckowiak
(10.) Rafał Grotowski
(11.) Karol Podzorski
(12.) Marcin Pobuta (gk)
(13.) Krzysztof Wybieralski
(14.) Lukasz Wybieralski
(15.) Piotr Mikula
(16.) Tomasz Cichy
Head coach
Mariusz Kubiak

( 1.) Brian Myburgh (gk)
( 2.) Gregor Maier (gk)
( 3.) Shaun Cooke
( 4.) Craig Jackson
( 5.) Craig Fulton
( 6.) Bradley Michalaro
( 7.) Gregg Clark
( 8.) Gary Boddington
( 9.) Wayne Denne
(10.) Mike Cullen
(11.) Kevin Chree
(12.) Grant Fulton
(13.) Greg Nicol
(14.) Matthew Hallowes
(15.) Grant Von Mayer
(16.) Brenton Key
Head coach
unknown

( 1.) Koo Jin-Soo (gk)
( 2.) Ji Seung-Hwan
( 3.) Han Beung-Kook
( 4.) Han Hyung-Bae
( 5.) Cho Myung-Jun
( 6.) Jeon Jong-Ha
( 7.) Hong Kyung-Seon
( 8.) Shin Seok-Kyo
( 9.) Song Seung-Tae
(10.) Kang Keon-Wook
(11.) Jeong Yong-Kyun
(12.) Lee Young-Hwang
(13.) Kim Jung-Chul
(14.) Yoo Mun-Ki
(15.) Yeo Woon-Kon
(16.) Kim Yoon (gk)
Head coach
unknown

( 1.) Ramón Jufresa (gk)
( 2.) Jordi Casas
( 3.) Joaquin Malgosa
( 4.) Jordi Arnau
( 5.) Juan de Dios
( 6.) Jaime Amat
( 7.) Juan Escarré
( 8.) Victor Pujol
( 9.) Josep Sánchez
(10.) Narcis Ventallo
(11.) Javier Arnau
(12.) Ramon Sala
(13.) Francisco Fabregas
(14.) Pablo Amat
(15.) Pablo Usoz
(16.) Antonio González (gk)
Head coach
Toni Forrellat

( 1.) Roger Thoma
( 2.) Adrian Berger
( 3.) Christian Arnold
( 4.) Reto Muggli
( 5.) Matthias Conz
( 6.) Stefan Bircher
( 7.) Daniel Pfister
( 8.) Benjamin Steinemann
( 9.) Alex Wintenberger
(10.) Toni Haberthur
(11.) Patrick Stutz
(12.) Oliver Bilgerig
(13.) Andy Gasser
(14.) Thierry Grandchamp
(15.) Christian Cavallet
(16.) Hugo Lessert
Head coach
Paul Schneider

Preliminary round

Group A

Group B

Crossovers

Placement matches

Final

Final ranking

Remarks
The first six (Spain, South Korea, New Zealand, Poland, Canada, and Malaysia) participated in the 1998 Men's Hockey World Cup in Utrecht, Netherlands.

See also
 1997 Women's Field Hockey World Cup Qualifier

References

External links
Field Hockey Canada

Hockey World Cup Qualifier Men
Men's Intercontinental Cup (field hockey)
International field hockey competitions hosted by Malaysia
Qualifiers